(born February 20, 1968) is a Japanese actress and tarento. She was born in Ashiya, Hyōgo.

Ishino debuted in 1985 as a pop singer, and first appeared on television in 1986. Her older sister is Mako Ishino. Ishino has also attended in Horikoshi High School with the idol singer Yukiko Okada.

Filmography

Film
Aitsu ni Koishite (1987)
Tokyo Blackout (1987)
Godzilla vs. Destoroyah (1995)
Shichinin no Tomurai (2005)

Television
 Ochoyan (2020), Kiku Tomikawa

See also 

 Teddy Boy Blues

External links 

JMDb profile 

1968 births
Horikoshi High School alumni
Japanese film actresses
Japanese comedians
Japanese television actresses
20th-century Japanese actresses
21st-century Japanese actresses
Actors from Hyōgo Prefecture
Living people
Musicians from Hyōgo Prefecture
20th-century Japanese women singers
20th-century Japanese singers
21st-century Japanese women singers
21st-century Japanese singers